Astripomoea is a genus of flowering plants belonging to the family Convolvulaceae.

Its native range is Tropical and Southern Africa, Arabian Peninsula.

Species:

Astripomoea cephalantha 
Astripomoea delamereana 
Astripomoea grantii 
Astripomoea hyoscyamoides 
Astripomoea lachnosperma 
Astripomoea longituba 
Astripomoea malvacea 
Astripomoea nogalensis 
Astripomoea polycephala 
Astripomoea procera 
Astripomoea rotundata 
Astripomoea tubiflora

References

Convolvulaceae
Convolvulaceae genera